James Lee Williams (born 12 April 1992), better known by the stage name The Vivienne, is a Welsh drag queen, known for being appointed the first UK RuPaul's Drag Race ambassador in 2015, winning the first series of RuPaul's Drag Race UK in 2019, and later returning to compete in the seventh season of RuPaul's Drag Race All Stars in 2022. As part of her victory, she was awarded her own online television series, later titled The Vivienne Takes on Hollywood. The series premiered on 9 April 2020 on BBC Three and follows her trip to Hollywood to produce her own music video.

Career
The Vivienne chose her name because she was known for wearing Vivienne Westwood clothing, adding the definite article to make it unique. She has worked in many Liverpool bars, including Superstar Boudoir, GBar and Heaven. In May 2015, she was crowned the UK Ambassador of RuPaul's Drag Race.

On 21 August 2019, The Vivienne was announced as one of the ten contestants to be competing in the first series of RuPaul's Drag Race UK. In September 2019, she participated in Jag Race, a racing competition in collaboration with Jaguar Cars, and raced for Sahir House, a charity based in her hometown of Liverpool that provides a space in which people can speak freely without fear of prejudice, stigma, abuse or exploitation in relation to HIV. In November 2019, she was crowned the first winner of RuPaul's Drag Race UK. In November to December 2019, The Vivienne, alongside the cast of the first series of RuPaul's Drag Race UK embarked on a tour hosted by Drag Race alum Alyssa Edwards.

In December 2019, The Vivienne alongside fellow RuPaul's Drag Race UK contestant Baga Chipz began starring in Morning T&T on WOW Presents Plus. The show saw The Vivienne and Baga reprise their Snatch Game impersonations of Donald Trump and Margaret Thatcher respectively, to host a fictional television news show, and consisted of six episodes as of January 2020. At DragCon UK in January 2020 an additional episode was filmed with The Vivienne and Baga appearing as themselves. Guests on the web series included fellow Drag Race UK alumni Sum Ting Wong as Queen Elizabeth II and Cheryl Hole as Gemma Collins.

In March 2020, World of Wonder announced six-part series The Vivienne Takes on Hollywood, documenting The Vivienne travelling to Los Angeles in order to make a music video. The show premiered on BBC Three on 9 April, and simultaneously started streaming on WOW Presents Plus. The same month, The Vivienne, once again alongside Baga Chipz, started presenting the UK version of I Like to Watch, a web series produced by Netflix in which they humorously review Netflix programming. She has since appeared on Celebrity Juice.

In July 2020, The Vivienne voiced as Donald Trump in the BBC Three documentary Trump in Tweets. She was one of the four competitors who appeared in the special Christmas edition of  The Great British Sewing Bee that was transmitted on New Year's Eve 2020 on BBC One. In June 2021, The Vivienne made a guest appearance as herself in the ITV soap opera, Emmerdale.
	
In April 2022, The Vivienne was announced as part of the seventh season of RuPaul's Drag Race All Stars, whereby former winners of the franchise returned for the title of "Queen of All Queens". In October 2022, she was announced to be competing in the fifteenth series of ITV ice-skating reality show, Dancing on Ice, setting her to be the first drag artist to participate in the show.

Personal life

Williams was born and raised in North Wales and moved to Liverpool at 16 years old. He is of Welsh and Romani heritage.

Williams married David Ludford in 2019.

Discography

Extended plays

Singles

As lead artist

As featured artist

Filmography

Television

Web

Awards and nominations

References

External links

The Vivienne on the Internet Movie Database

1992 births
Living people
20th-century Welsh LGBT people
21st-century Welsh LGBT people
Gay entertainers
People educated at Rydal Penrhos
People from Colwyn Bay
RuPaul's Drag Race All Stars contestants
RuPaul's Drag Race UK winners
Welsh drag queens
Welsh gay men